Native hydrangea is a common name for several Australian plants and may refer to:

Abrophyllum ornans
Cuttsia viburnea, endemic to eastern Australia